Gene Wray Dalton (1928–1997) was a professor of organizational behavior at Harvard Business School and later at Brigham Young University (BYU).

Dalton was born in Pocatello, Idaho to Dell Moroni Dalton and his wife the former Rachel Wray.  He was an alumnus of Pocatello High School.  Dalton served as a missionary for the Church of Jesus Christ of Latter-day Saints in the Central States Mission.  He earned a bachelor's degree in accounting from the University of Utah.  He was than an accounting instructor at Idaho State University before joining the Air Force ROTC in 1955 and studying at Brigham Young University.  He then went on to receive a Doctorate of Business Administration degree from Harvard Business School.

From 1983-1987 Dalton was the chair of BYU's Department of Organizational Behavior.

The Marriott School of Management has a scholarship named after Dalton.

Among other positions in the LDS Church Dalton served as a stake president.

Dalton was married to the former Bonnie LaRae Berrett.  They were the parents of eight daughters.

Publications
Novations: Strategies for Career Management with Paul H. Thompson, 1986.
The Distribution of Authority in Formal Organizations with Abraham Zaleznik and Louis B. Barnes.
Motivation and Control in Organizations with Paul R. Lawrence and Jay Lorsch.

Sources
Deseret News Jan. 9, 1997 Obituary of Dalton
Ernest L. Wilkinson, ed., Brigham Young University: The First 100 Years (Provo: BYU Press, 1976) Vol. 4, p. 107.
article on Paul R. Lawrence
history of BYU's Department of Organizational Behavior

1928 births
People from Pocatello, Idaho
Latter Day Saints from Idaho
University of Utah alumni
Idaho State University faculty
Brigham Young University alumni
Harvard Business School alumni
Harvard Business School faculty
Brigham Young University faculty
1997 deaths
Latter Day Saints from Massachusetts
Latter Day Saints from Utah